André Luiz de Almeida Mendonça (born 27 December 1972) is a Brazilian attorney, Presbyterian pastor, and politician currently serving as Justice of the Supreme Federal Court. He is the third evangelical Christian positioned to join the top court, and former Minister of Justice and Public Security and Attorney General of the Union in the administration of President Jair Bolsonaro. Prior to assuming this role, he served as Attorney General of Brazil in the same administration.

Mendonça was a Attorney for Brazil since 2000 and was special assistant of the Comptroller General of the Union Wagner Rosário between 2016 and 2018.

Biography
After graduating with a degree in law in 1993 at Law School of Bauru University Center, in São Paulo, Mendonça concluded his specialization in public law at University of Brasília, master's degree at University of Salamanca, with a thesis about corruption and the Rechtsstaat and received the highest grade for his doctorate thesis, Estado de Derecho y Gobernanza Global ("Rechtsstaat and Global Governance"), at the same university. Mendonça is assistant professor in Salamanca and the Getúlio Vargas Foundation.

He also graduated with a degree in theology at South American Theological College, in Londrina, and served as a pastor at the Presbyterian Church of Brazil, in Brasília.

He was a lawyer at Petrobras Distribuidora, until joining the career of Attorney for Brazil at the Attorney General's office (AGU) in 2000. He served as Head of the Solicitor General Office at Londrina, Vice-Principal of the office's school, coordinator of Disciplinary Measures and General Auditor.

Mendonça was director of Department of Public Patrimony and Administrative Probity, nominated by then Attorney General Dias Toffoli, and coordinated the Permanent Group of AGU Pro-Active Acting. In 2010, the Department under his leadership helped to recover part of R$169 million (US$ ), intended for the construction of the Labor Regional Court in São Paulo, which were embezzled from public safes. Between the convicted were justice Nicolau dos Santos Neto and then Senator Luiz Estevão.

He also gained prominence at AGU for winning the special category in Innovare Award in 2011 - which honors efficient practices in the Judiciary, Public Prosecutor's Office, Public Defense and advocacy. Innovare recognized the practices of fight against corruption adopted by AGU.

Between 2016 and 2018, he was special assistant for Comptroller General Wagner de Campos Rosário.

On 21 November 2018, President-elect Jair Bolsonaro named him as the next Attorney General. He succeeded Grace Mendonça, who praised the selection of her successor from among AGU employees. Prior to his nomination, Mendonça had mostly worked at the Controllership General of the Union, where he was responsible to lead leniency agreements which involved the collaboration of great companies involved in illicit cases.

On 27 April 2020, Bolsonaro named Mendonça to be Minister of Justice and Public Security upon the resignation of Sérgio Moro. He assumed that office on 29 April. One year later, Mendonça return to his former office of Attorney General and was replaced by Anderson Torres.

After the retirement of Justice Marco Aurélio Mello from the Supreme Federal Court in July 2021, President Bolsonaro announced Mendonça to replace him in the court.

He left the AGU on 6 August 2021 replaced by Bruno Bianco. Mendonça's appointment for the Supreme Court was approved by the Senate on 1 December 2021 in a voting of 47-32. making him the first evangelical Christian positioned to join the top court.

References

|-

|-

|-

1972 births
Living people
People from Santos, São Paulo
Brazilian Presbyterians
University of Brasília alumni
University of Salamanca alumni
21st-century Brazilian lawyers
Ministers of Justice of Brazil
Attorneys General of Brazil